Anacleto Medina (1788 – July 17, 1871)  was a Uruguayan military, politician and caudillo who participated in the Brazilian War, the Argentine Civil War and the Guerra Grande in the Banda Oriental. He served in the Federal Army in the Unitary Army, and also in the Colorados and Blancos armies, during the Uruguayan Civil War.

Born in Las Víboras, Colonia Department, Uruguay, he was the son of Luis Bernardo Medina, born in Santiago del Estero, Argentina, and Petrona Biera, belonging to a Creole family from the Banda Oriental.

During his military career he was under the command of the main military leaders, including Francisco Ramírez, Juan Lavalle, Fructuoso Rivera, Justo José de Urquiza and Ricardo López Jordán. He died assassinated after the defeat of Manantiales, event occurred on July 17, 1871.

References 

1788 births
1871 deaths
19th-century Uruguayan people
People from Montevideo
Uruguayan generals
Federales (Argentina)
Unitarianists (Argentina)
People from Entre Ríos Province